"You Are What You Love" is the second and final single from Rabbit Fur Coat by Jenny Lewis with the Watson Twins. It was released May 1, 2006 on Team Love.

Track listing
 "You Are What You Love"
 "Fireplace"

External links
Jenny Lewis official website
Team Love Records

2006 singles
Jenny Lewis songs
Rough Trade Records singles
The Watson Twins songs
2006 songs